The Îlots des Apôtres or Îles des Apôtres are a group of small and uninhabited rocky islands in the north-western part of the Crozet Archipelago in the southern Indian Ocean,  north of Île aux Cochons.

Description
There are two larger islands (Île Grande - Big Island, and Île Petite - Little Island), together occupying almost 90 percent of the area. The highest peak is Mont Pierre ( on Île Grande. The islands are very steep.

History
On the night of 1 July 1875, the Strathmore, a three-masted ship sailing between the United Kingdom and New Zealand, was wrecked in the vicinity after striking a reef.  Of the 89 passengers on board, 44 survived on Île Grande until 21 January 1876, when they were rescued by another ship.

Important Bird Area
The islets have been identified as an Important Bird Area (IBA) by BirdLife International as a breeding site for seabirds, with at least 25 species nesting there.  The birds include wandering, grey-headed, light-mantled, sooty, black-browed and Indian yellow-nosed albatrosses, great-winged, soft-plumaged, white-chinned and blue petrels, medium-billed prions, northern giant petrels, common diving petrels, Crozet blue-eyed shags and Kerguelen terns.

The islets

See also
 Administrative divisions of France
 French overseas departments and territories
 Islands controlled by France in the Indian and Pacific oceans
 List of Antarctic and sub-Antarctic islands

References

also see "This barren rock", by Silvie Haisman. , also a radio play on the ABC National radio - tell me a shipwreck

External links
 Map

Important Bird Areas of the Crozet Islands
Apotres
Seabird colonies